Basketball Northern Ireland (BNI) is the National Governing Body for Basketball in Northern Ireland. The Association is affiliated to Basketball Ireland has responsibility for the promotion, development and administration of all basketball activities in Northern Ireland.

Basketball Northern Ireland Affiliated Clubs 

Belfast Phoenix Basketball Club 
Omagh Thunder Basketball Club 
Queens Basketball Club 
North Star Basketball Club 
Belfast Star
Newry Fliers
Ballymena Blackstone
Belfast Tropics
Andersontown Basketball Club
University of Ulster Jordanstown
University of Ulster Coleraine
Tyrone Towers
Queen's University Belfast
Letterkenny Heat
Letterkenny IT
Strabane
Omagh
Lisnaskea Lakers
Magherafelt Titans
Belfast Storm (Dissolved)
Carrick Flyers
Bangor Sharks Basketball Club

External links
Official Basketball Northern Ireland Website 
North Star Basketball Club
Queens Basketball Club 
Queen's University Belfast Basketball Club
Bangor Sharks Basketball Club
Newry Fliers Basketball Club

References 

No
Basketball in Northern Ireland
Basketball